The Leland Stanford Mansion, often known simply as the Stanford Mansion, is a historic mansion and California State Park in Sacramento, California, which serves as the official reception center for the Californian government and as one of the official workplaces of the Governor of California.

Built in 1856, the mansion was formerly the residence of Leland Stanford, 8th Governor of California and founder of Stanford University. The Stanford family donated the estate to the Roman Catholic Diocese of Sacramento in 1900, which maintained a children's home on the estate until 1978. Subsequently, the Californian government purchased the property to serve as the Californian capital's ceremonial reception center and as a state park, officially known as the Leland Stanford Mansion State Historic Park.

History 

The original owner and builder of the home was Sacramento merchant Shelton C. Fogus, a wealthy Sacramento building merchant. The Renaissance Revival architecture of the original home is attributed to Seth Babson, who later designed the E.B. Crocker residence and art gallery that are now part of the Crocker Art Museum.

Stanford family
Leland Stanford, president of the Central Pacific Railroad (one of the Big Four tycoons) and a rising member of the Republican Party, purchased the home for $8,000 in June 1861, shortly before his election as California governor that year. During his two-year governorship, the Stanford Mansion served as the state's executive office and living quarters. Succeeding governors Frederick Low and Henry Huntly Haight would also make the mansion their office.

Between 1871 and 1872, the Stanford family embarked on an ambitious remodeling of the residence. As Stanford had had to attend his gubernatorial inauguration by rowboat in 1862, the home was raised twelve feet in response to frequent flooding from the Sacramento River. In addition, one story was added to both the bottom and top of the mansion. The result was a four-story remodeled architectural sandwich in which the original 2-story house sat between the added floors.

Following Stanford's death in 1893, his widow Jane Lathrop Stanford continued to oversee the home.

Diocese of Sacramento ownership

In 1900, Jane Stanford donated the home to the Roman Catholic Diocese of Sacramento to be used for the children of California. It was given to the Sisters of Mercy who ran it as an orphanage named the Stanford and Lathrop Memorial Home for Friendless Children.

In 1932, the home was handed over the Sisters of Social Service who eventually transformed the mansion from an orphanage to a residence for dependent high school girls. A fire in the mansion in 1940 brought considerable damage to the fourth floor.

The mansion was designated a California Historical Landmark in 1957 and a National Historic Landmark in 1987.

Official reception house and state park

In 1978, the government of California acquired the property for use as a state park. The Sisters of Social Services would remain on the grounds until 1987, when California State Parks designated the mansion and the immediate surrounding land as a state historic park. Following the state's decision, the National Park Service declared the mansion as a National Historic Landmark on May 28, 1987. It was not until September 2005 that the mansion would finally be open to public tours, after $22 million worth of renovation and rehabilitation.

The mansion is also the state's official reception center for leaders from around the world.

Prior to the reopening of the mansion, California did not have a location for the hosting of official functions for nearly 40 years. Today the mansion is frequently used by the Government of California to host foreign dignitaries. The Governor also retains an office in the mansion. Tours of the mansion are offered daily but can be impacted by official functions on behalf of the Governor's Office or the California State Legislature leadership.

Restoration 

Beginning in 1991, with the help of Sacramento businessman and former Stanford University professor Peter McCuen, the Stanford Mansion underwent a 14-year renovation at a cost of $22 million ($ million in ). Accurate restoration of the home and its rooms was aided by both an extensive study of the home in 1986 through the Historic American Buildings Survey, and through a large collection of photographs of the home taken in 1868 by Alfred A. Hart, and again in 1872 by Eadweard Muybridge.

The repairs and restoration were completed in 2005, when the mansion opened to the public. California State Parks offers guided tours through the fully refurbished home. Rooms of the house have been restored to their 1872 appearance. The Leland Stanford Mansion is physically accessible, including the gardens, Visitor Center and restrooms. Elevators provide access to the upper floors of the mansion's tour route. A tactile model of the Mansion is also available in the Visitor Center.

See also
California Governor's Mansion
History of Sacramento, California
National Register of Historic Places listings in Sacramento County, California
California Historical Landmarks in Sacramento County, California

References

External links 

 Leland Stanford Mansion State Park website
 Leland Stanford Mansion Foundation website
 Library of Congress "America's Memory" — Historic American Buildings Survey—HABS project files
: Stanford Mansion historic photo gallery

California State Historic Parks
Parks in Sacramento County, California
Buildings and structures in Sacramento, California
Houses in Sacramento County, California
History of Sacramento, California
1856 establishments in California
Houses completed in 1856
1957 establishments in California
Protected areas established in 1957
California Historical Landmarks
Stanford, Leland, Mansion
National Register of Historic Places in Sacramento, California
National Historic Landmarks in California
Renaissance Revival architecture in California
Second Empire architecture in California
Museums in Sacramento, California
Historic house museums in California
Governor of California
Gilded Age mansions